Kaupo Kikkas is an Estonian fine art photographer.

Life and work
He graduated Tallinn Music High School, but switched from music to photography instead. He has often photographed people in the field of music, like Arvo Pärt, etc.

He specialises in photographing people related to classical music.

Awards 
In 2009 he won 1st, 2nd, and 3rd prizes in the group portrait category of the Wedding and Portrait Photographers International competition.

In 2012 he won the portrait photography category in Wedding and Portrait Photography Baltic 2012.

Books 
Amazonas. Elu ainus foto. 2013. .

Gallery

References

External links 

 

Estonian photographers
Living people
People from Tallinn
Year of birth missing (living people)